Fraport AG Frankfurt Airport Services Worldwide, commonly known as Fraport, is a German transport company which operates Frankfurt Airport in Frankfurt am Main and holds interests in the operation of several other airports around the world. In the past the firm also managed the smaller Frankfurt-Hahn Airport located 130 kilometers west of the city. It is listed on both the Xetra and the Frankfurt Stock Exchange. As of 2019, the company has 22,514 employees and annual revenues of about €3.3 billion. Fraport was the main sponsor of the Bundesliga football team Eintracht Frankfurt from 2002 to 2012.

Fraport AG is also involved in ground handling operations at its own operated airports and at third-party operated airports. It mostly operates ground handling services in a deregulated context. Fraport was also involved to make Frankfurt Airport and Indira Gandhi International Airport ready for A380 operations.

Operations
In addition to various management and infrastructure subsidiaries related to Frankfurt Airport, Fraport's holdings include the following airport operating companies:

Greece

As of December 2015, Greece's government signed a privatization deal with Fraport and Greek energy firm Copelouzos with  awarding them a 1.2 billion euro contract to lease and manage 14 regional airports for a concession period of 40 years. The Fraport started managing the 14 regional airports from 11 April 2017. They have published their master plan for each airport and the computer renderings (external views) of the 14 airports after the completion of the construction works.

The airports included in the concession are:

Aktion National Airport
Cephalonia International Airport
Chania International Airport
Corfu International Airport
Kavala International Airport
Kos Island International Airport
Mytilene International Airport
Mykonos Island National Airport
Rhodes International Airport
Samos International Airport
Santorini (Thira) National Airport
Skiathos Island National Airport
Thessaloniki International Airport
Zakynthos International Airport

Many complaints have been filed by General Aviation aircraft owners from Greece and abroad, due to high pricing policy and lack of parking spaces in Greek airports operated by Fraport. Article in major Greek newspaper "To Vima" and AOPA Hellas website references

Headquarters
The company's articles of association designate Frankfurt am Main as the company's registered office. Fraport's facilities are on the property of Frankfurt Airport in the city's Flughafen district. Its head office building is Building 178, close to Tor 3 (gate 3).

Shareholders
The company's current shareholding structure is as follows.

References

External links 
 

Airport operators
Transport companies of Germany
Companies based in Frankfurt
Government-owned companies of Germany
Companies in the MDAX